A two-dimensional polymer (2DP) is a sheet-like monomolecular macromolecule consisting of laterally connected repeat units with end groups along all edges. This recent definition of 2DP is based on Hermann Staudinger's polymer concept from the 1920s. According to this, covalent long chain molecules ("Makromoleküle") do exist and are composed of a sequence of linearly connected repeat units and end groups at both termini.

Moving from one dimension to two offers access to surface morphologies such as increased surface area, porous membranes, and possibly in-plane pi orbital-conjugation for enhanced electronic properties. They are distinct from other families of polymers because 2D polymers can be isolated as multilayer crystals or as individual sheets.

The term 2D polymer has also been used more broadly to include linear polymerizations performed at interfaces, layered non-covalent assemblies, or to irregularly cross-linked polymers confined to surfaces or layered films. 2D polymers can be organized based on these methods of linking (monomer interaction): covalently linked monomers, coordination polymers and supramolecular polymers.

Topologically, 2DPs may thus be understood as structures made up from regularly tessellated regular polygons (the repeat units). Figure 1 displays the key features of a linear and a 2DP according to this definition. For usage of the term "2D polymer" in a wider sense, see "History".

Covalently-linked polymers 
There are several examples of covalently linked 2DPs which include the individual layers or sheets of graphite (called graphenes), MoS2, (BN)x and layered covalent organic frameworks. As required by the above definition, these sheets have a periodic internal structure.

A well-known example of a 2D polymer is graphene; whose optical, electronic and mechanical properties have been studied in depth.  Graphene has a honeycomb lattice of carbon atoms that exhibit semiconducting properties.  A potential repeat unit of graphene is a sp2-hybridized carbon atom. Individual sheets can in principle be obtained by exfoliation procedures, though in reality this is a non-trivial enterprise.

Molybdenumdisulfide can exist in two-dimensional, single or layered polymers where each Mo(IV) center occupies a trigonal prismatic coordination sphere.

Boron nitride polymers are stable in its crystalline hexagonal form where it has a two-dimensional layered structure similar to graphene. There are covalent bonds formed between boron and nitrogen atoms, yet the layers are held together by weak van der Waals interactions, in which the boron atoms are eclipsed over the nitrogen.

Two dimensional covalent organic frameworks (COFs) are one type of microporous coordination polymer that can be fabricated in the 2D plane. The dimensionality and topology of the 2D COFs result from both the shape of the monomers and the relative and dimensional orientations of their reactive groups. These materials contain desirable properties in fields of materials chemistry including thermal stability, tunable porosity, high specific surface area, and the low density of organic material. By careful selection of organic building units, long range π-orbital overlap parallel to the stacking direction of certain organic frameworks can be achieved.

Many covalent organic frameworks derive their topology from the directionality of the covalent linkages, thus small changes in organic linkers can dramatically affect their mechanical and electronic properties. Even small changes in their structure can induce dramatic changes in stacking behavior of molecular semiconductors.

Porphyrins are an additional class of conjugated, heterocyclic macrocycles. Control of monomer assembly through covalent assembly has also been demonstrated using covalent interactions with porphyrins. Upon thermal activation of porphyrin building blocks, covalent bonds form to create a conductive polymer, a versatile route for bottom-up construction of electronic circuits has been demonstrated.

COF synthesis 

It is possible to synthesize COFs using both dynamic covalent and non-covalent chemistry. The kinetic approach involves a stepwise process of polymerizing pre-assembled 2D-monomer while thermodynamic control exploits reversible covalent chemistry to allow simultaneous monomer assembly and polymerization. Under thermodynamic control, bond formation and crystallization also occur simultaneously. Covalent organic frameworks formed by dynamic covalent bond formation involves chemical reactions carried out reversibly under conditions of equilibrium control. Because the formation of COFs in dynamic covalent formation occurs under thermodynamic control, product distributions depend only on the relative stabilities of the final products.  Covalent assembly to form 2D COFs has been previously done using boronate esters from catechol acetonides in the presence of a lewis acid (BF3*OEt2).

2D polymerization under kinetic control relies on non-covalent interactions and monomer assembly prior to bond formation. The monomers can be held together in a pre-organized position by non-covalent interactions, such as hydrogen bonding or van der Waals.

Coordination polymers

Metal organic frameworks 
Self-assembly can also be observed in the presence of organic ligands and various metals centers through coordinative bonds or supramolecular interactions. Molecular self- assembly involves the association by many weak, reversible interactions to obtain a final structure that represents a thermodynamic minimum. A class of coordination polymers, known also as metal-organic frameworks (MOFs), are metal-ligand compounds that extend "infinitely" into one, two or three dimensions.

MOF synthesis 
Availability of modular metal centers and organic building blocks generate wide diversity in synthetic versatility. Their applications range from industrial use to chemiresistive sensors. The ordered structure of the frame is largely determined by the coordination geometry of the metal and directionality of functional groups upon the organic linker. Consequently, MOFs contain highly defined pore dimensions when compared with conventional amorphous nanoporous materials and polymers. Reticular Synthesis of MOFs is a term that has been recently coined to describe the bottom-up method of assembling cautiously designed rigid molecular building blocks into prearranged structures held together by strong chemical bonds. The synthesis of two-dimensional MOFs begins with the knowledge of a target "blueprint" or a network, followed by identification of the required building blocks for its assembly.

By interchanging metal centers and organic ligands, one can fine-tune electronic and magnetic properties observed in MOFs. There have been recent efforts synthesize conductive MOFs using triyphenylene linkers. Additionally, MOFs have been utilized as reversible chemiresistive sensors.

Supramolecular polymers 

Supramolecular assembly requires non-covalent interactions directing the formation of 2D polymers by relying on electrostatic interactions such as hydrogen bonding and van der Waals forces. To design artificial assemblies capable of high selectivity requires correct manipulation of energetic and stereochemical features of non-covalent forces.  Some benefits of non-covalent interactions is their reversible nature and response to external factors such as temperature and concentration. The mechanism of non-covalent polymerization in supramolecular chemistry is highly dependent on the interactions during the self-assembly process. The degree of polymerization depends highly on temperature and concentration. The mechanisms may be divided into three categories: isodesmic, ring-chain, and cooperative.

One example of isodesmic associations in supramolecular aggregates is seen in Figure 7, (CA*M) cyanuric acid (CA) and melamine (M) interactions and assembly through hydrogen bonding. Hydrogen bonding has been used to guide assembly of molecules into two-dimensional networks, that can then serve as new surface templates and offer an array of pores of sufficient capacity to accommodate large guest molecules.  An example of utilizing surface structures through non-covalent assembly uses adsorbed monolayers to create binding sites for target molecules through hydrogen bonding interactions. Hydrogen bonding is used to guide the assembly of two different molecules into a 2D honeycomb porous network under ultra high vacuum seen in figure 8. 2D polymers based on DNA have been reported

Characterization 
2DPs as two dimensional sheet macromolecules have a crystal lattice, that is they consist of monomer units that repeat in two dimensions. Therefore, a clear diffraction pattern from their crystal lattice should be observed as a proof of crystallinity. The internal periodicity is supported by electron microscopy imaging, electron diffraction and Raman-spectroscopic analysis.

2DPs should in principle also be obtainable by, e.g., an interfacial approach whereby proving the internal structure, however, is more challenging and has not yet been achieved.

In 2014 a 2DP was reported synthesised from a trifunctional photoreactive anthracene derived monomer, preorganised in a lamellar crystal and photopolymerised in a [4+4]cycloaddition. Another reported 2DP also involved an anthracene-derived monomer

Applications 
2DPs are expected to be superb membrane materials because of their defined pore sizes. Furthermore, they can serve as ultrasensitive pressure sensors, as precisely defined catalyst supports, for surface coatings and patterning, as ultrathin support for cryo-TEM, and many other applications.

Since 2D polymers provide an availability of large surface area and uniformity in sheets, they also found useful applications in areas such as selective gas adsorption and separation. Metal organic frameworks have become popular recently due to the variability of structures and topology which provide tunable pore structures and electronic properties. There are also ongoing methods for creation of nanocrystals of MOFs and their incorporation into nanodevices. Additionally, metal-organic surfaces have been synthesized with cobalt dithionlene catalysts for efficient hydrogen production through reduction of water as an important strategy for fields of renewable energy.

The fabrication of 2D organic frameworks, have also synthesized two-dimensional, porous covalent organic frameworks to be used as storage media for hydrogen, methane and carbon dioxide in clean energy applications.

History 
First attempts to synthesize 2DPs date back to the 1930s when Gee reported interfacial polymerizations at the air/water interface in which a monolayer of an unsaturated fatty acid derivative was laterally polymerized to give a 2D cross-linked material. Since then a number of important attempts were reported in terms of cross-linking polymerization of monomers confined to layered templates or various interfaces. These approaches provide easy accesses to sheet-like polymers. However, the sheets' internal network structures are intrinsically irregular and the term "repeat unit" is not applicable (See for example:). In organic chemistry, creation of 2D periodic network structures has been a dream for decades. Another noteworthy approach is "on-surface polymerization"  whereby 2DPs with lateral dimensions not exceeding some tens of nanometers were reported. Laminar crystals are readily available, each layer of which can ideally be regarded as latent 2DP. There have been a number of attempts to isolate the individual layers by exfoliation techniques (see for example:).

References 

Polymer chemistry